Grayson Perry: All Man is a 2016 British television miniseries about masculinity presented by Grayson Perry.

Episode 1: Hard Man 
Air date 5 May 2016

Perry meets cage fighters.

Episode 2: Top Man 
Air date 12 May 2016

Perry meets the police and underclass people in Skelmersdale, Lancashire.

Episode 3: Rational Man 
Air date 19 May 2016

Perry meets men who work in finance in the City of London.

References

External links 

Channel 4

2016 British television series debuts
2016 British television series endings
Channel 4 documentaries
English-language television shows